The Thompson language, properly known as Nlaka'pamuctsin, also known as the Nlaka'pamux ('Nthlakampx') language, is an Interior Salishan language spoken in the Fraser Canyon, Thompson Canyon, Nicola Country of the Canadian province of British Columbia, and formerly in the North Cascades region of Whatcom and Chelan counties of the state of Washington in the United States.  A dialect distinctive to the Nicola Valley is called Scw'exmx, which is the name of the subgroup of the Nlaka'pamux who live there.

Phonology 

Nlaka'pamuctsin is a consonant-heavy language. The consonants can be divided into two subgroups: obstruents, which restrict airflow, and sonorants or resonants, which do not. The sonorants are often syllabic consonants, which can form syllables on their own without vowels.

Consonants

Vowels 

Stress is used with an acute accent; á.

Morphology and syntax

Researchers working in the Generative tradition have speculated that Salishan languages lack lexical categories such as nouns and verbs. Evidence for such an absence of contrast between parts of speech in Nlaka'pamuctsin come from a lack of clear morphological markers (e.g. morphemes) that differentiate nouns and verbs. Instead, generative linguists discuss morphology and syntax in Salishan based on a framework of predicates and particles. However, more contemporary work suggests a changing understanding of Salishan grammar.  Some Salishanists believe that functional categories are not prescriptive of lexical categories. Work in Functional linguistics suggests that other factors beyond morphological evidence code lexical categories in languages. In Salishan, the distinction would be less overt than in some other languages.

Lexical suffixes

One morphological feature of Nlaka'pamuctsin is lexical suffixes. These are words that add nuance to predicates and can be affixed to the ends of root words to add their general meaning to that word. Thompson and Thompson assert that as a result of English language influence, speakers are using these more complex predicates less and less in favor of simpler predicates with complements and adjuncts, resulting in “a general decline in the exploitation of the rich synthetic resources of the language.”

See also
Chief Nicola

References

External links
Native.Languages.org entry
Nlekepmxcin keyboard from languagegeek.com
Human rights plaque in Nlha7kápmx language (archive of SchoolNet page)
Portions of the Book of Common Prayer in Nlaka'pamux or Thompson

Interior Salish languages
First Nations languages in Canada
Languages of the United States
Indigenous languages of the North American Plateau